Quaker Hill Historic District may refer to:

Quaker Hill Historic District (Waterford, Connecticut), listed on the NRHP in Connecticut
Quaker Hill Historic District (Wilmington, Delaware), listed on the NRHP in Delaware

See also
Quaker Hill (disambiguation)